Ahmet Muhip Dıranas (1909 – June 27, 1980) was a leading Turkish poet and writer.

Biography
He was born in Sinop, Ottoman Empire in 1909. Having completed his primary education in Sinop, he moved to Ankara and graduated from Ankara High School. He then went to Istanbul for a university degree and studied philosophy at Istanbul University. He returned to Ankara in 1938, and worked as a director in the CHP headquarters. Having completed his military service, he continued his career as a publication director in the Society for the Protection of Children in Ankara.

In the 1950s he was a regular contributor of the Democrat Party newspaper Zafer.

Bibliography
Poetry
 "Şiirler" (1974)
 "Kırık Saz" (1975)

Plays
 "Gölgeler" (1947)
 "O Böyle İstemezdi" (1948)

Translated plays
 "Aptal" (1940 - translated from Dostoevski's Idiot)

Research
 "Fransa'da Müstakil Resim" (1937 - with Cahit Sıtkı Tarancı)

See also
 List of contemporary Turkish poets

References

 Culture and Tourism Ministry of Turkey - Biography of Ahmet Muhip Dıranas 
 Ykykultur.com.tr - Biography and bibliography of Ahmet Muhip Dıranas

External links
 Ahmet Muhip Dıranas - On his life and poetry

1909 births
1980 deaths
Turkish poets
People from Sinop, Turkey
20th-century poets